Buan County (Buan-gun) is a county in North Jeolla Province, South Korea. It is bounded by the city of Jeongeup on the east, the county of Gochang on the south, the city of Gimje on the north, and Yellow Sea on the west. Buan is divided into 1 eup, 12 myeon, and 510 ri. Buan had a 2001 estimated population of 74,716 people and a 2018 population of 54,441 people with an area of 493.35 km2. Famous people from Buan include Joseon Dynasty kisaeng and poet, Yi Mae-chang. Like many rural areas in southern Korea, it has seen shrinking population with many younger people moving north to larger cities such as Seoul. This county should not be confused with Muan, the new capital of South Jeolla Province.

History

During the Samhan Period Buan County was called Mahan, and it was also called Jiban statelets among the 54 Mahan statelets. 
During the Beakjae Period there were two small localities: Gaehwa and Heunlyangmae. In B.C 757(16th year of King Gyeongdeok's regime), after Silla united the three kingdoms, Gyehwa was renamed as Buryeong (sometimes called Gyebal) and was a part of Gobu. Honliang was renamed as Hee-an and was also a part of Gobu.

During the Goryeo period, the county was called Boan-hyeon and was also nicknamed as Namju. In late Goryeo, during King U's regime, there were local governors were posted to Buryeong-hyeon and Boan-hyeon.

During the 14th and 16th year of king Taejong's reign, the two localities Buryeong-hyeon and Boan-hyeon were merged and separated several times. Then in December 1416, the two localities were merged and was named Buan, the "bu" coming from Buryeong and the "an" coming from Boan. The following year a locality named Heungdeokjin was made a part of Buan and was renamed as Buanjin. A high-level civil servant named the Byeongmasa ruled over the county. In 1423 (5th year of King Sejong's regime), the ruler was changed from Cheomjeoljesa to Hyeongam. Locality Buan was changed into Boan County in 1895 (32nd year of King Gojong's regime), when several different terms representing localities (bu, mok, gun, and hyeon) were unified to a single therm - gun(county). In 1914, during the Japanese occupation, the administrative district was changed: Wido become a part of Yeonggwang County(South Jeolla Province), and Biando was annexed to Gunsan City. Baeksan, Geoma, and Deoklim of Gobu County were annexed to Buan County.

In 1943 Byreong-myeon was upgraded into Buan-eup.

On January 1, 1963, According to changes in the administrative districts, Wido-myeon of Yeonggwang County (South Jeolla Province) was annexed to Buan County.

With the reclamation works of Gaehwado in 1978, the country's territory was increased by 3,968ha. In 1983 Sannae-myeon and Jinseo-myeon were divided into Gawhwa-myeon and Jinso-myeon. Currently, the administrative district consists of 1 eup and 12 myeon. The total area is 493 km2 (farming land 42%, forest land 42%, other 16%). Buan county is located and longitude 126 degrees 40 minutes, latitude 35 degrees 40 minutes. It is located to the west of North Jeolla Province and its border meets with Gunsan City at the sea. To the north there is Gimje City, to the southeast there is Jeongeup City, and to the south there is Gochang County. The land is low in the east side and high on the west site. The peninsula sticks out on the Yellow Sea. To the southwest direction a mountain named Byeonsan stands in layers. To the northeast there are wide and rich fields. The coast line which runs from the mouth of the Dongjingang River to Julpo-myeon Upo-ri, is 66 km long. The influence of sea winds bring about a lot of snow in the winter.

Climate

Transport
Buan Bus Terminal provides direct services to Seoul, Daejeon and Gwangju, as well as services within North Jeolla province to  Jeonju, Gimje, Iksan, Gunsan, Jeongeup and Gochang. The nearest railway station is at Gimje on the Honam Line.

Major road
 National Route 30
 National Route 23
 Seohaean Expressway

Notable places
Eight Scenic Views of Byeonsan
WoongYeonJoDae
Jigso Waterfall
SoSaMoJong
WolMyeongMooAe
SeoHaeNakJo (Glow of the Setting Sun on the West Sea)
ChaeSeokBeomJu
JiPoSinGyeong
GaeAmGoJeok

Museum
New & Renewable Energy Village 
Seokjeong Literary Museum
Hwimok Art Museum

Temple
Naeso Temple
Gaeam Temple

Twinning
twinned :

  Ansan, South Korea  
  Goyang, South Korea  
  Gwangmyeong, South Korea  
  Suyeong District, South Korea  
  Jung District, Busan, South Korea  
  Pohang, South Korea
  Chungju, South Korea

Friendship :
  Dobong District, South Korea  
  Dongdaemun District, South Korea  
  Honghu, China

See also
 Geography of South Korea

References

External links

Buan County government home page
http://www.buan.go.kr/ (korean)
http://www.buan.go.kr/eng (english)

 
Counties of North Jeolla Province